Nisala Gira (Silent Honour) is a 2007 Sri Lankan Sinhala psychological drama film directed by Tanuj Anawaratne and produced by Nita Fernando for Padma Films with the funds of National Film Corporation of Sri Lanka. It stars Nita Fernando herself, Ravindra Randeniya in lead roles along with debut actress Nimmi Harasgama and Saumya Liyanage. Music composed by Aruna Lian. It is the 1094th Sri Lankan film in the Sinhala cinema. The film has received mixed reviews from critics.

Plot

Cast
 Nita Fernando as Radha
 Ravindra Randeniya as Minister Saliya
 Angela Seneviratne as Cynthia
 Nimmi Harasgama as Nanditha
 Saumya Liyanage as Marko
 Iranganie Serasinghe as Radha's mother-in-law
 Chandra Kaluarachchi as Kudu Amma
 Damitha Abeyratne as Poddi
 Kanchana Mendis as Asela
 Rozanne Diasz as Nicola
 Jayani Senanayake as Female jailor

References

2007 films
2000s Sinhala-language films
2000s psychological drama films
Sri Lankan drama films
2007 drama films